, literally meaning Open the path and often translated as The Path, is a book written by Konosuke Matsushita, a Japanese industrialist and founder of Panasonic. The book was first published in 1968, and has been a perennial bestseller since then, with nearly 4.5 million copies sold worldwide. The book is a collection of short essays previously published in PHP Research Institute magazine.

References 

  

1968 books
Japanese books